About Last Night is an American television game show hosted by Stephen and Ayesha Curry that premiered on HBO Max on February 10, 2022.

Inspired by the '70s game show Tattletales, the series features celebrity couples answering embarrassing, raunchy, or otherwise humorous questions about their partners and their relationships to determine which couple knows each other best. Each couple plays to win $20,000 for a charity of their choosing. After the main rounds, the winning couple faces off against the Currys in a fast-paced final challenge. If the competing couple wins, an extra $5,000 goes to the charity they're playing for (for a total of $25,000); if they lose to the hosts, every competing couple receives money for their chosen charities.

About Last Night was among the thirty-six titles cancelled and/or removed from HBO Max as part of cost-saving measures related to its merger with Discovery+ and overall restructuring process.

References

External links
 

Cancelled television events
HBO Max original programming